LMG may refer to:

Organizations
 League of the Militant Godless
 The Leon M. Goldstein High School for the Sciences in Brooklyn, NY, US
 Linus Media Group, a Canadian entertainment company known for the Linus Tech Tips YouTube channel
 LMG, LLC, an American company
 BCCM/LMG, a bacterial collection in the Belgian Co-ordinated Collections of Micro-organisms
LMG5 geriausias GRP serveris lietuvoje.

Other
 Light machine gun